

Æthelwine (or Ethelwine or Aethelwine) was an Anglo-Saxon Bishop of Wells. He was consecrated in 1013, and was expelled to make way for Brihtwine, but was restored and then once more expelled. He died possibly around 1027.

Citations

References

Further reading

External links
 

Bishops of Wells
1020s deaths
Year of birth unknown
Place of birth unknown
Date of death unknown
Place of death unknown
11th-century English Roman Catholic bishops